Brenda Song  (born March 27, 1988) is an American actress. Born in California, Song began her career at the age of six, working as a child model. She made her screen debut with a guest appearance on the sitcom Thunder Alley (1995), and went on to roles such as the children's television series Fudge (1995) and the Nickelodeon series 100 Deeds for Eddie McDowd (1999). Song starred in the Disney Channel original film The Ultimate Christmas Present (2000), which won her a Young Artist Award. She subsequently signed a contract with Disney Channel and earned widespread recognition for playing the titular character in the action film Wendy Wu: Homecoming Warrior (2006), and London Tipton in the comedy franchise The Suite Life (2005–2011), earning her acclaim and two Young Hollywood Awards. She additionally played the character of Tia on Phil of the Future (2004–2005), and had starring roles in the television films Get a Clue (2002) and the comedy film Stuck in the Suburbs (2004). 

Song made her transition into mainstream roles with the critically acclaimed biographical drama film The Social Network (2010) and went on to roles in the ABC political thriller Scandal (2012–2013), the Fox sitcom New Girl and the sitcom Dads (2013). In October 2014, she signed a talent holding deal with Fox and 20th Century Fox Television and was subsequently cast in several television pilots for NBC and CBS, including the medical drama series Pure Genius (2016–2017) and the action drama series Station 19 (2018–2020). She provided the voice of Anne Boonchuy in the Disney Channel animated series Amphibia (2019–2022) and starred as Madison Maxwell in the Hulu comedy-drama series Dollface (2019–2022). She has also headlined the romantic comedy film Angry Angel (2017), the psychological thriller film Secret Obsession (2019), the comedy-drama film Changeland (2019), and the romantic comedy Love Accidentally (2022).

Early life
Brenda Song was born on March 27, 1988, in Carmichael, California, a suburb of Sacramento, to a Thai and Hmong family. Her paternal grandparents were from the Xiong clan (熊; Xyooj in Hmong), but changed their last name to Song after arriving in the United States. Her parents were born in Thailand and met as adults in Sacramento. Her father works as a school teacher and her mother is a homemaker. She has two younger brothers named Timmy and Nathan Song. 

When she was six years old, Song moved with her mother to Los Angeles, California, to support her acting career; the rest of the family followed two years later. As a young girl, Song wanted to do ballet, while her younger brother wanted to take taekwondo. She said, "My mom only wanted to take us to one place," so they settled on taekwondo. Although Song cried all the way through her first class, she now holds a black belt in taekwondo. Song was named an All-American Scholar in the ninth grade. She was homeschooled and earned a high school diploma at age 16, then took courses at a community college. She graduated from the University of California, Berkeley in 2009, majoring in psychology and minoring in business.

Career

1995–2004: Early work and child acting 
Song began in show business as a child fashion model in San Francisco after being spotted in a shopping mall by an agent from a modeling school. She began acting at the age of five or six in a Little Caesars commercial, and then a Barbie commercial. Her first film role was in the 1995 Requiem, an AFI student short film by actress Elizabeth Sung. "She came in confident [at the auditions]. She was very focused, and it was very obvious that she loved what she was doing," said Sung. The film is about a waitress/dancer named Fong who remembers her loving brother and their bittersweet childhood in Hong Kong. The seven-year-old Song played a young version of "Fong", who is portrayed as an adult by Tamlyn Tomita. The film won a CINE Golden Eagle award. She appeared in another short film directed by Elizabeth Sung called The White Fox. Song next appeared in two episodes of the television program Thunder Alley, and was a regular in the children's television series Fudge, in which she portrayed Jenny. Her theatrical film debut was in Santa with Muscles, a 1996 independent film starring professional wrestler Hulk Hogan.

After a small role in Leave It to Beaver (1997), she appeared in the Nickelodeon television series 100 Deeds for Eddie McDowd, where she played Sariffa Chung in thirteen episodes. After 100 Deeds, she had a number of small parts in television shows such as 7th Heaven, Judging Amy, ER, Once and Again, The Brothers García, Popular, Bette, The Bernie Mac Show, The Nightmare Room, For the People, and George Lopez. Two of Song's early roles led to recognition in the Young Artist Awards. Her role in the 2000 Disney Channel Original Movie, The Ultimate Christmas Present, won her the award for "Best Performance in a TV Movie Comedy, Supporting Young Actress". The film centers on two teenage girls, Allison Thompson (Hallee Hirsh) and Samantha Kwan (Song), who find a weather machine and make it snow in Los Angeles. Her 2002 appearance on The Bernie Mac Show led to her nomination for "Best Performance in a TV Comedy Series, Guest Starring Young Actress". In the same year, she was in the 20th Century Fox family film Like Mike, which grossed over $60 million. The film stars rapper Bow Wow as an orphan who can suddenly play NBA-level basketball. Song portrays the character Reg Stevens, a thirteen-year-old orphan. it was successful enough to spawn a sequel. Song did not participate in the sequel.

In 2002, Song signed a contract with Disney and appeared in the Disney Channel movie Get a Clue (alongside Lindsay Lohan). After 2002, Song continued to make guest appearances in popular sitcoms such as That's So Raven and One on One. She had a recurring role as Tia in the Disney Channel series Phil of the Future, appearing in seven episodes of the series in 2004 and 2005. In Summer 2004, Song starred in the Disney Channel Original Movie Stuck in the Suburbs, portraying Natasha Kwon-Schwartz. The television premiere received 3.7 million viewers. The film is about two teenage girls living in suburbia who accidentally exchange cell phones with a famous teen singer. She later said: "When Stuck came out it was crazy 'cause we went to Six Flags and we were there and so many kids recognized us from Stuck in the Suburbs, I'm like wow that movie must have done really well." In an interview with W Magazine, Song revealed three life-changing things that happened when she was 15, including an early acceptance to Harvard University that she turned down. Speaking of the time, she said, "My mom got breast cancer for the first time, I booked Suite Life, and I was accepted into the college I'd always wanted to go to. My dad, who's a schoolteacher, sat me down and said, 'Here's the thing. You have an amazing opportunity, if acting is what you want to do. Education is the most important thing. You go to college to figure out what you want to do, but if this is what you want to do, you have an opportunity to do it."

2005–2009: Breakthrough with Disney 
In 2005, Song began appearing in the role of spoiled heiress London Tipton in the Disney Channel Original Series, The Suite Life of Zack & Cody. The role was named "Paris" in an early draft of a script and alludes to Paris Hilton (London spoofing Paris, and Tipton is the name of the hotel her father owns in the show). She got the role without an audition and was surprised to find her friend Ashley Tisdale working in the show. Song says, "London is my fantasy person, I wish I could be her. I wish I had her closet." The series is about the residents and workers at the fictional Tipton Hotel in Boston and mainly centers around the trouble-making twins, Zack and Cody Martin (Dylan and Cole Sprouse), and London Tipton (Song). The series premiered on the Disney Channel on March 18, 2005, receiving four million viewers, making it the most successful premiere for the Disney Channel in 2005. Critics often praised Song's performance in the Suite Life series. An April 2009 andPOP.com article stated that as London Tipton, "Song is the One to Steal the Spotlight" on the Disney Channel. It said, "if you ever watched an episode of 'The Suite Life with Zack & Cody' you should realize that show is watchable because of one character: London Tipton. Brenda plays the ditzy spoiled hotel heiress London (an allusion to Paris Hilton) and, if I could say so myself, she does quite an excellent job doing so." While commenting on Song, MSN'''s 2009 cover story on the series stated, "Song is one of the main reasons why the "Suite Life" franchise remains one of the most successful and highly rated series in the Disney stable." In a 2009 People magazine article, the character was described as a "melodramatic high-seas diva." The series eventually earned a 2007 Young Artist Award for "Best Family Television Series (comedy)", Emmy nominations for "Outstanding Children's Program" (twice) and "Outstanding Choreography", and three Nickelodeon Kids' Choice Award nominations for "Favorite TV show" in 2007, 2008, and 2009. In 2006 Song earned an Asian Excellence Award nomination for "Outstanding Newcomer" for her part in the series. 

After her debut on the Suite Life series, Song became a regular on the Disney Channel, and had a voice role in Disney Channel's American Dragon: Jake Long series. In 2006, Song had a voice-over role in Holidaze: The Christmas That Almost Didn't Happen. She later starred in an online series called London Tipton's Yay Me!. Song was part of the Disney Channel Circle of Stars, a group of performers from several different Disney Channel television series. She was featured in the recording and music video of a version of "A Dream Is a Wish Your Heart Makes", which was included on the special edition Cinderella platinum edition DVD and on the DisneyMania 4 CD, released in April 2006. In the Suite Life High School Musical-themed episode, Song performed "Bop To The Top" and "Really Great". "Really Great" became the theme song for the online series, London Tipton's Yay Me!. She sang "Bling Is My Favourite Thing" on another Suite Life episode. In these episodes, Song purposefully sang poorly in character as London Tipton. In 2008, Ian Scott wrote and produced demo songs for her, credited to Mark Jackson Productions.

Song's first starring role as the title character was in the 2006 Disney Channel Original Movie Wendy Wu: Homecoming Warrior, which had over 5.7 million viewers at its premiere.R. Thomas Umstead (January 22, 2007). "Disney Movie Skips to Another Record". Multichannel News. Accessed December 11, 2008. Wendy Wu was planned to be a comedy, but the directors of the film were having trouble finding a suitable actor with both the comedic presence and taekwondo ability to play the main character, originally named Kenny Lu. Lydia Cook, one of the films's directors, said, "Brenda was originally brought in to play the [supporting] monk's role. We started training with her in martial arts, and that's when we realized that she should be Kenny Lu. They quickly switched things around and offered Brenda the lead in the movie. She had the perfect combination of wit and martial arts." Song had to break a brick with her hand in a screen test before landing the title role. According to The New York Times, the film became a "star vehicle" for Song. The film was about an average, popular Chinese-American teenager whose life is turned upside down by a visit from a young Chinese monk (Shin Koyamada). The monk claims she is the reincarnation of a powerful female warrior and the only person who can prevent an ancient evil spirit from destroying the world. In a second story line, Wendy and most of her family struggle with keeping their culture and heritage. Song felt she could relate to the message since she knew little about her own people before making the film. She said, "I really identified with Wendy because I don't want to not know where I came from". To promote the film, she posed for the cover of Seventeen, Teen People, Teen, Seventeen Malaysia, and several other magazines, and traveled to Malaysia, Singapore, and Costa Rica. A Wendy Wu: Homecoming Warrior sequel, starring Song and Koyamada, was announced in the end of 2007. The film received positive reviews from critics. UltimateDisney.com called the role "a strong departure from her flaky London Tipton character in The Suite Life of Zack & Cody", adding that Song "shows in this movie that she no longer has to restrict herself to playing the dumb one." The site praised the film, stating, "Wendy Wu: Homecoming Warrior is an enjoyable little telefilm, rife with killer action sequences (for a DCOM), and a great showcase of talent in both acting and martial for Brenda Song. Aside from a few totally clichéd characters and situations, it's worth 91 minutes of your time." Allmovie described Song as a "charming and appealing personality, even when playing a shallow airhead". While commending Disney for the strong Asian cast, a BellaOnline review noted that it is rare to see a female martial arts star with a black belt. Song did most of her own stunt work for the film, with guidance from Koichi Sakamoto, executive producer for the Power Rangers series. Song was inspired to endure the stunt training by the way her mother dealt with breast cancer in 2005. Disney Channel executive vice president Gary Marsh called the film "Buffy the Vampire Slayer meets Crouching Tiger Hidden Dragon" and said of Song: "She's incredibly talented, she's smart. She adds diversity to our network, and she's a real kid."
Song reprised her role as London Tipton in the Suite Life spin-off, The Suite Life on Deck. The show's premiere on the Disney Channel drew 5.7 million viewers, and it became the most-watched series premiere on Canada's Family Channel. The show became the most-watched scripted series among children aged 6 to 11 in 2008. In 2009, the show was the most-watched scripted series among children and the second most-watched scripted series among pre-teens. Disney ordered second and third seasons for the series. Song also starred as Paige in an animated television special for NBC, "Macy's Presents Little Spirit: Christmas in New York". In late 2008, Song made a special appearance at the grand opening of the RTA HealthLine in Cleveland. In May 2009, Disney Channel's executive vice president Gary Marsh issued a press release, which stated: "with this second-season extension, the cast of 'The Suite Life' makes Disney Channel history by becoming the longest running continuous characters on our air – 138 half-hour episodes. We are thrilled for them, and for the brilliant, inspired production team that made this extraordinary run possible." According to The Wall Street Journal, Song's participation in the series led to her becoming highly popular among children between the ages of seven and ten. Also in 2009, she starred in the telefilm Special Delivery, a film about a bonded courier, Maxine (Lisa Edelstein) and a troubled teen, Alice (Song). The Daily Record called it a "likeable comedy". The Australian publication Urban CineFilm gave Song a positive review for her performance in the film. Song also appeared in the theatrical film College Road Trip with Raven-Symoné and Martin Lawrence.

 2010–present: Mainstream film and television 
In 2010, Song joined the main cast of Columbia Pictures' The Social Network alongside Jesse Eisenberg, Andrew Garfield and Justin Timberlake. Song portrayed Christy Lee, a Harvard University student who dates Eduardo Saverin (Andrew Garfield). In 2012, Song starred in the short film First Kiss along with her Social Network costar Joseph Mazzello. First Kiss was screened at numerous film festivals throughout the US and won the Best Short Film award at the Omaha Film Festival and TriMedia Film Festival. In 2012 and 2013, Song had a recurring role as Alissa in the TV show Scandal in the first and second seasons. In 2013, Song had a recurring role as Daisy in New Girl. In August 2013, Song was cast in a leading role in the Fox television series Dads, in which Song portrayed Veronica. The show's pilot episode was criticized by Asian American watchdog groups because Song's character wore a stereotypical "sexy Asian schoolgirl" costume, which was deemed "racist" by watchdog groups. In an interview with Entertainment Weekly, Song defended the show and denied the racism allegations. Fox refused to re-shoot the scenes which were deemed racist by watchdog groups.The Hollywood Reporter Fox Rejects Request to Reshoot 'Racist' 'Dads' Scenes  The show premiered September 17, 2013, but in May 2014, Fox canceled the series after only one season. 

In October 2014, Song signed a talent holding deal with Fox and 20th Century Fox Television to star in a television project.The Wrap 'New Girl's' Brenda Song to Star in Upcoming Fox TV Project  In April 2015, Song was cast in a regular role in the NBC comedy pilot Take It From Us. In November 2015, Song was cast in the show Life in Pieces as Bonnie. In February 2016, Song was cast in CBS pilot Bunker Hill. Later renamed Pure Genius, the series was picked up by CBS and is scheduled to begin airing in the 2016-2017 television season. In March 2017, Song was cast as a series regular in the CBS pilot Real Life. She was also cast in Seth Green's directorial debut Changeland. In August 2017, it was announced that Song would be starring in Freeform's first original holiday movie, Angry Angel. The film is part of the network's "Countdown to 25 Days of Christmas" series of programming, which premiered November 18, 2017. In March 2018, it was revealed Song would join the cast of new show Station 19 for a multi-episode arc. In December 2018, it was announced that Song would star in the Netflix psychological thriller Secret Obsession. The film was released on July 18, 2019. In January 2019, it was announced that Song is starring in the Hulu television series Dollface alongside Kat Dennings. From 2019-2020, she voiced Anne Boonchuy in the Disney animation series Amphibia In June 2019, she appeared in the Seth Green movie Changeland. She also appeared as a guest star in Aly & AJ's music video for the song "Star Maps", from their 2019 EP Sanctuary. In 2022, she began appearing on The Proud Family: Louder and Prouder, voicing news anchor Vanessa Vue. In 2022, she starred in the Amazon Freevee original movie Love Accidentally as the lead character Alexa. Radhika Menon of Decider wrote "the film under-uses Brenda Song."

 Personal life 
From 2010 to 2017, Song was in an on-and-off relationship with musician Trace Cyrus, to whom she was engaged from 2011 to 2012. In 2017, Song shared that she was in a relationship with actor Macaulay Culkin. Their son was born on April 5, 2021.

 In the media  

In 2005, an article "Maths Spotlight on... Brenda Song" in Scholastic Math included facts about Song and mathematical guidance from her. Song appeared alongside Paula Abdul and several other celebrities in a "Our Time to Vote" commercial, which aimed to encourage American citizens to vote during the 2008 presidential election. In 2006, CosmoGirl named Song the "Queen of Disney", citing her major contributions on the Disney Channel. Song ranked ninth in Netscape's 2007 "Top 10 Pretty Petites in Entertainment", was voted one of AOL's "Top 20 Tween (and Teen) TV Stars", and was ranked #3 on Maxim's Asian Hot 100 of 2008 list. Song was also ranked #45 in AIM's "Top 100 Celebs Under 25" list. TV Guide listed her in its 2008 list of "13 Hottest Young Stars to Watch". In April 2008, a picture of Song was used in an ad for an escort agency in the LA Weekly. A representative from Disney told TMZ.com, "This is an unauthorized use of Brenda Song's image and her personal attorney has issued a cease and desist to the advertiser." Song filed a libel suit seeking $100,000 in damages. Song stated, "As a role model to millions of young people, I feel I have to take a stand against this company in regard to its exploitation of my image." The settlement was announced in March 2009.

In 2009, Song was featured in Celebuzz's "Rising Stars" list and was described as one of "young Hollywood's most promising rising stars". In 2009, the blog Angry Asian Man named her one of the most influential Asian Americans under the age of 30. In 2009, Song participated in the "Diet Pepsi Easter Holiday House" event. She decorated an egg at the event that was sold in an online auction benefiting Feeding America. In 2006, Song was hostess for the "A World Of Change" annual charity fashion show to benefit Optimist Youth Homes & Family Services. She also supported the 10th Annual L.A. Cancer Challenge. In 2008, Song was part of the "Power of Youth carnival", a benefit for the St. Jude's Children's Research Hospital. In 2006 and 2007, she participated in the YMCA Healthy Kids Day in Chicago. She began hosting a Disney special daily segment called Pass the Plate'' in 2007, in which she helps children and their families learn more about nutrition and healthy food. The series is produced in ten countries in association with Disney Channel. Song returned for the second season of the miniseries. 

Song was a spokesperson for Disney's environmental campaign, Disney's Friends for Change. She was featured in several commercials on the Disney Channel for the campaign. The charity's aim was to explain how children can help preserve the Earth and invited them to go to the Friends for Change website to register and pledge, offering them the chance to help choose how Disney will invest $1 million in environmental programs. In 2010, she was the celebrity endorser of the Walt Disney Company's Disney Cruise Line. In 2011, she was also the spokesperson of the clothing brand OP.

Filmography

Film

Television

Video games

Web series

Awards and nominations

References

Further reading
 Tamra Orr (2009). Brenda Song (A Robbie Reader). Mitchell Lane Publishers. .
 Katherine Rawson (2009). Brenda Song (Kid Stars!). PowerKids Press. .

External links

 
 

1988 births
20th-century American actresses
21st-century American actresses
Actresses from Los Angeles
Actresses from Sacramento, California
American child actresses
American child models
American female taekwondo practitioners
American film actresses
Film producers from California
American people of Hmong descent
American people of Thai descent
Television personalities from Los Angeles
American women television personalities
American television actresses
American voice actresses
Female models from California
Living people
Models from Los Angeles
People from Carmichael, California
American women film producers